Araköy can refer to:

 Araköy, İspir
 Araköy, Narman